NGC 320 is a spiral galaxy in the constellation Cetus. It was first discovered in 1886 by Francis Leavenworth.

References

0320
?
Cetus (constellation)
Spiral galaxies
003510